Kamouraska–Rivière-du-Loup was a former provincial electoral district in the Bas-Saint-Laurent region of Quebec, Canada.

It was created for the 1939 election, from parts of the Kamouraska and Rivière-du-Loup electoral districts.  It existed only for that one election.  It disappeared in the 1944 election and its successor electoral districts were the re-created Kamouraska and Rivière-du-Loup.

Members of Legislative Assembly
 Léon Casgrain, Liberal (1939–1944)

External links
 Election results (National Assembly)
 Election results (Quebecpolitique.com)

Former provincial electoral districts of Quebec